Hamburger Helper is a packaged food product from Eagle Foods. As boxed, it consists of a dried carbohydrate (often pasta or rice), with powdered seasonings contained in a packet. The consumer is meant to combine the contents of the box with browned ground beef ("hamburger"), water, and, with some varieties, milk to create a complete one-dish meal. 

There are also variations of the product designed for other meats, such as "Tuna Helper" and "Chicken Helper". Some of these feature other starches, such as potatoes.

In May 2022, General Mills announced an agreement to sell the brand to Eagle Foods for approximately $610 million. On July 5, 2022, the sale was completed.

History
The packaged pasta brand "Hamburger Helper" was introduced in 1971 in response to a meat shortage and rising meat prices. In 2005, Food Network rated it third on its list of "Top Five Fad Foods of 1970". In 2013, the company shortened the brand's name to just "Helper".

The Hamburger Helper mascot is "the Helping Hand" or "Lefty"—a four-fingered, left-hand white glove with a face on the palm and a red spherical nose. It often appears in the product's television commercials and on packages.

Hamburger varieties

The basic (and most popular) version of Hamburger Helper is a box of dried pasta with seasoning that is designed to be cooked with ground beef. Hamburger Helper offers a variety of flavors, including Lasagna, Cheeseburger Macaroni, Bacon Cheeseburger, Philly Cheesesteak, and others.

Other varieties
There are also variations designed for other meats: "Tuna Helper" and "Chicken Helper".

Tuna Helper became successful as the second variety to appear on the market, in 1972.

Fruit Helper was introduced in 1973. These were dessert products made with canned or fresh fruit. The Fruit Helper line has since been discontinued.

Chicken Helper was introduced in 1984 in response to the wide availability of inexpensive boneless and skinless chicken breasts.

Asian Helper is a selection of four main Asian-American-style dishes, three made with chicken and one with beef.

Whole Grain Helper options include Lemon & Herb Chicken, Honey Mustard Chicken, Cheeseburger Mac, and beef Stroganoff flavors made with whole-wheat pasta.

Pork Helper was introduced in 2003. Varieties included pork fried rice and pork chops with stuffing. The product was discontinued shortly after its introduction.

Hamburger Helper Microwave Singles were introduced in 2006. This product requires water and brief cooking in the microwave to produce a single serving portion of some of the most popular flavors. Chicken Helper flavors were added in 2007 despite the brand being discontinued shortly thereafter. It returned in 2013 as Chicken and Chili Helper.

In popular culture
A 1977 book collecting material from the satirical TV show Saturday Night Live contained an unproduced sketch called "Placenta Helper," an ad for a product which “lets you stretch your placenta into a tasty casserole." The sketch was written by Tom Davis and future United States Senator Al Franken.

The animated television series Family Guy, featured Lefty the mascot in one of their famous "cutaway gags" from the 2009 episode "Business Guy". The gag involved Lefty, who appears with his neurologically impaired brother, who takes the form of a right-handed glove, representing the non-existent brand  "Cheeseburger Helper". Peter Griffin remarks that  he could just add cheese to the meal he makes with Lefty's Hamburger helper, which Lefty's brother angrily rebukes. Lefty explains that his brother was deprived of oxygen during childbirth, that he will never be "in step with the rest of us" and this is his way of taking care of his brother asking Peter to "just let him have this one". Peter acquiesces to Lefty's brother's delight and whispers to Lefty "I'm so sorry for your burden, you're a good brother,"  

In 1979, Scott Spiegel wrote, produced and directed a short film entitled Attack of the Helping Hand, which featured a "Hamburger Helper" oven mitt as a killer glove.

On April 1, 2016, General Mills commissioned an EP as an April Fools' Day prank, titled Watch the Stove. According to a press release, the EP was produced for General Mills by a team at St. Paul, Minnesota's McNally Smith College of Music. The EP's title is a parody of the Jay-Z and Kanye West collaborative album Watch the Throne. It contains five songs, all of which are about Hamburger Helper. It instantly achieved a viral status, played over four million times on SoundCloud in less than three days, with many listeners finding value in the brand's promotion of younger artists.

See also
 American chop suey
 Chili mac
 Makarony po-flotski

References

External links
 

Pasta dishes
Hamburgers (food)
Products introduced in 1971
American brands